Juan García Such (31 December 1937 – 16 October 2009) was a Spanish racing cyclist. He rode in the 1965 Tour de France.

References

External links
 

1937 births
2009 deaths
Spanish male cyclists
Place of birth missing
People from Costera
Sportspeople from the Province of Valencia
Cyclists from the Valencian Community